Interstate 610 (I-610) is a freeway that forms a  loop around the inner city sector of the city of Houston, Texas. I-610, colloquially known as The Loop, Loop 610, The Inner Loop, or just 610, traditionally marks the border between the inner city of Houston ("inside the Loop") and its surrounding areas. It is the innermost of the three Houston beltways, the other two being Beltway 8 (Sam Houston Tollway) and State Highway 99 (SH 99, Grand Parkway), of which various segments are under construction or planning. In Houston, the area inside the 610 Loop is the urban core. Jeff Balke of the Houston Press wrote that the freeway "is as much a social and philosophical divide as a physical one". Mike Snyder in the Houston Chronicle wrote that as someone from the 610 Loop he historically felt "kind of special" due to being close to "the city’s historical core and its major business, educational and cultural institutions".

Route description
Major segments of I-610 are known as the North Loop, the South Loop, the East Loop, and the West Loop. The North Loop runs from U.S. Route 290 (US 290) to US 90. The East Loop runs from US 90 to SH 225. The West Loop runs from US 290 to the South Post Oak Road spur, and the South Loop runs from South Post Oak Road to SH 225. Sometimes, a direction name is added as a suffix to denote a more specific part of a portion of the loop and this does not denote the direction of traffic flow. For example:
 North Loop West Freeway refers to the portion of the North Loop between US 290 and I-45. North Loop East refers to the portion between I-45 and US 90.
 East Loop North Freeway refers to the portion of the East Loop between US 90 and I-10. East Loop South refers to the portion between I-10 and SH 225.
 South Loop East Freeway refers to the portion of the South Loop between SH 225 and SH 288. South Loop West refers to the portion between SH 288 and the South Post Oak Road spur.
 West Loop South Freeway refers to the portion of the West Loop between the South Post Oak Road spur and Buffalo Bayou (which is just south of I-10/US 90). West Loop North refers to the portion between Buffalo Bayou and US 290.

Lane configurations

Starting at US 290, moving in a clockwise direction, mainlane counts are as follows:
 Four lanes each way between US 290 and I-45
 Six lanes each way between I-45 and I-69/US 59
 Four lanes each way between I-69/US 59 and I-10
 Five lanes each way between I-10 and SH 225
 Four lanes each way between SH 225 and SH 288
 Five lanes each way between SH 288 and South Post Oak Road spur
 Five lanes northbound, four lanes southbound between South Post Oak Road spur and Bissonnet exit
 Five lanes northbound, five lanes southbound between Bissonnet exit and Bellaire Boulevard exit
 Four lanes northbound, five lanes southbound between Bellaire Boulevard exit and Woodway Drive
 Five lanes each way Woodway Drive and I-10/US 90
 Six lanes each way between I-10/US 90 and US 290

History

The concept of building a bypass highway around Houston was first proposed in 1931, but plans did not begin to formalize until 1941. The loop was initially proposed to transport troops and materials around the city. On May 3, Harris County voters approved a bond to build the "Defense Loop". It was officially designated as Loop 137 in 1942, and the North Loop was approved by the Texas Transportation Commission. World War II delayed construction of the Loop until the 1950s.

In July 1953, the city of Houston asked the Texas Transportation Commission to include two new sections of Loop 137 (the West Loop and the South Loop) as part of the state's highway system. It was initially rejected, but, in October 1954, the North Loop was upgraded to a freeway, and the West and South Loops were approved as freeways.

When the Interstate Highway system was authorized in 1956, the then–C-shaped Loop 137 (now designated I-610) was adopted into the plan. The East Loop would not be approved until 1960. That segment was finished in 1973 with the opening of the Sidney Sherman Bridge over the Houston Ship Channel.

Construction on the North Loop began in 1950. Construction was sporadic throughout the 1950s and 1960s. It was completed in 1976 with the interchange that connects Loop 610 to I-10 east of Houston.

In the early 1990s, TxDOT proposed a widening project for the West Loop, which, at the time, was the busiest freeway in Houston. One of the proposals was for a dual–dual freeway with a total of 24 lanes in some places, which would have made it the widest freeway in the world. Amid vocal opposition and little apparent support, the plans for expansion were canceled.

In the late 1990s, the need to repave and reconstruct portions of the West Loop became evident. The reconstruction project was approved, but only as a "no-capacity-added" project; only safety and structural improvements could be made. However, some Houston residents have noted that merging lanes and exit ramps are particularly long and, in effect, serve as additional lanes.

, the segment of the West Loop from the Katy Freeway to the Southwest Freeway is ranked by TxDOT as the most congested roadway in the state, based on annual hours of delay per mile.

Parts of I-610 flooded during Hurricane Harvey in 2017.

Exit list

See also

 I-610 Ship Channel Bridge

References

External links

3-Digit Interstates profile for I-610

Freeways in Houston
10-6 Texas
10-6
610
6 Texas
Transportation in Harris County, Texas